A list of animated feature films that were released in 2016.

Highest-grossing animated films of 2016
The following is a list of the 10 highest-grossing animated feature films first released in 2016 as of 1 of August 2017.

Zootopia and Finding Dory became the fourth and fifth animated films after Toy Story 3 (2010), Frozen (2013), and Minions (2015) to gross over $1 billion, and are currently the ninth and eighth highest-grossing animated films of all time and the 42nd and 45th highest-grossing films of all time. Kung Fu Panda 3 passed Monkey King: Hero Is Back to become the highest-grossing animated film of all time in China only to be overtaken by Zootopia. Your Name passed Spirited Away to become the highest-grossing anime film of all time. Zootopia became the highest-grossing original animated film of all time, surpassing Finding Nemo ($940.3 million in 2003). Along with Finding Dory, it became one of two animated films to earn over $1 billion in the same year, a first in cinematic history.

References

 Feature films
2016
2016-related lists